Bee is a surname.

Those bearing it include the following:

 Andrew Bee (soldier) (fl. 1860s), American soldier
 Barnard E. Bee Sr. (1787–1853), Texas politician
 Barnard Elliott Bee Jr., (1824–1861), American soldier
 Carlos Bee (1867–1932), American politician
 Clair Bee (1896–1983), American basketball coach
 Ephraim Bee (1802–1888), American politician
 Guy Bee (fl. 2000s), American director & producer
 Hamilton P. Bee (1822–1897), American soldier & politician
 Helen Bee (born 1939), American psychologist
 Jaymz Bee (fl. from 1980s), Canadian musician
 Kenny Bee (born 1953), Hong Kong musician & actor
 Molly Bee (1939–2009), American singer
 Samantha Bee (born 1969), Canadian performer
 Thomas Bee (1739–1812), American farmer & jurist
 Thomas Walker Bee (1822–1910), South Australian public servant
 Tim Bee (fl. 2000s), American politician
 Tom Bee  (fl. from 1970s), American musician & entrepreneur

See also
Bee (given name)